Isomäki is a Finnish surname. Notable people with the surname include:

 Joni Isomäki (born 1985), Finnish ice hockey player
 Risto Isomäki (born 1961), Finnish writer

Finnish-language surnames